Nikolaus is a given name. Notable people with this name include the following:

Given name

Art
Nikolaus Geiger (1849–1897), German sculptor and painter.
Nikolaus Gerhaert (c.1420 – 1473), Dutch sculptor
Nikolaus Glockendon (fl. 1515 – 1534), German illustrator
Nikolaus Hagenauer (c. 1445/1460 — 1538), German sculptor
Nikolaus Knüpfer (1609–1655), Dutch painter
Nikolaus van Hoy (b. Antwerp, 1631 – d. Vienna, 25 June 1679), Flemish painter

Military
Nikolaus Andreas von Katzler (1696–1760), Prussian lieutenant general
Nikolaus Barbie (1913–1991), German SS and Gestapo functionary known as Klaus Barbie
Nikolaus Heilmann (1903–1945), German Nazi 
Nikolaus Heinrich von Schönfeld (1733–1795), Prussian general 
Nikolaus Herbet (1889 – unknown), German SS officer 
Nikolaus Ritter (1899–1974), German military officer
Nikolaus von Falkenhorst (1885–1968), German general
Nikolaus zu Dohna-Schlodien (1879–1956), German naval officer
Nikolaus von Maillot de la Treille (1774–1834), Bavarian lieutenant general and War Minister
Nikolaus von Rauch (1851–1904), Prussian cavalry officer
Nikolaus von Vormann (1895–1959) German general

Music
Nikolaus Harnoncourt (1929–2016), Austrian conductor
Nikolaus Hillebrand (born 1948), German operatic bass-baritone
Nikolaus Selnecker (1530–1592), German musician
Nikolaus Simrock (1751–1832), German musician
Nikolaus Kittel (1805/6 – 1868), Russian violin and bow make
Nikolaus Kraft (1778–1853), Austrian cellist and composer
Nikolaus Lehnhoff (1939–2015), German opera director
Nikolaus Newerkla (born 1974), Austrian harpsichordist, arranger and conductor
Nikolaus von Krufft (1779–1818), Austrian composer

Politician
Nikolaus Berlakovich (born 1961), Austrian politician
Nikolaus Dumba (1830–1900), Austrian politician
Nikolaus Georg von Reigersberg (1598–1651), German politician
Nikolaus Krell (c. 1551 – 1601), German politician
Nikolaus Meyer zum Pfeil (1451–1500), Swiss renaissance humanist and politician
Nikolaus Müller (1892–1980), German politician
Nikolaus Welter (1871–1951), Luxembourgish writer and politician known as Nik Welter

Religion
Nikolaus Creutzer (died 1525), Roman Catholic prelate
Nikolaus Decius (c. 1485 – 1541), German monk
Nikolaus von Laun, German Bohemian Augustinian friar
Nikolaus Gross (1898–1945), German Roman Catholic
Nikolaus Herman (c. 1500 – 1561), German Lutheran cantor
Nikolaus Messmer (1954–2016), Kyrgyzstani Roman Catholic prelate
Nikolaus Nilles (1828–31 – 1907), Luxembourgian Roman Catholic writer and teacher
Nikolaus of Banz, Polish Roman Catholic canon
Nikolaus Schienen (1491–1556), German Roman Catholic prelate
Nikolaus Schneider (born 1947), German evangelical
Nikolaus Storch (pre-1500 – after 1536), German radical lay-preacher
Nikolaus von Dinkelsbühl, Austrian Roman Catholic clergyman, pulpit orator and theologian
Nikolaus von Schönberg (1472–1537), German Cardinal

Royalty & nobility
Jobst Nikolaus I, Count of Hohenzollern (1433–1488), German nobleman
Nikolaus I, Prince Esterházy (1714–1790), Hungarian prince
Nikolaus II, Prince Esterházy (1765–1833), Hungarian prince
Nikolaus III, Prince Esterházy (1817–1894), Hungarian prince
Nikolaus VI Graf Pálffy von Erdőd (1657–1732), Hungarian nobleman known as Miklós Pálffy
Nikolaus Bodman (1903–1988), German nobleman, ornithologist and bird conservationist
Nikolaus, Count Esterházy (1583–1645), Hungarian royal
Nikolaus, Hereditary Grand Duke of Oldenburg (1897–1970), German royal
Prince Nikolaus of Liechtenstein (born 1947), Liechtensteinian Ambassador
Prince Nikolaus of Thurn and Taxis (1885–1919) (1885–1919), German royal
Prince Nikolaus Wilhelm of Nassau (1832–1905), Prussian royal

Science
Nikolaus Ager (1568–1634), French physician and botanist
Nikolaus Correll (born 1977), German roboticist
Nikolaus Eglinger (1645–1711), Swiss physician
Nikolaus Friedreich (1825–1882), German scientist
Nikolaus Joseph Brahm (1754–1821), German zoologist
Nikolaus Joseph von Jacquin (1727–1817), Austrian scientist
Nikolaus Hofreiter (1904–1990), Austrian mathematician
Nikolaus Poda von Neuhaus (1723–1798), Austrian entomologist
Nikolaus Riehl (1901–1990), German physicist
Nikolaus Rüdinger (1832–1896), German anatomist
Nikolaus Wolfgang Fischer (1782–1850), German chemist.

Sports
Nikolaus Biewer (1922–1980), German footballer
Nikolaus Jedlicka (born 1987), Austrian poker player known as Niki Jedlicka
Nikolaus Mayr-Melnhof (born 1978), Austrian racing driver
Nikolaus Mondt (born 1978), German ice hockey player
Nikolaus Moser (born 1990), Austrian tennis player
Nikolaus Ott (born 1945), West German rower known as Niko Ott
Nikolaus Resch, Austrian sailor

Other fields
Count Nikolaus Szécsen von Temerin (1857–1926), Austro-Hungarian diplomat
Nikolaus Bachler (born 1951), Austrian theater and opera director and actor
Nikolaus Becker (1809–1845), German writer
Nikolaus Blome (born 1963), German journalist 
Nikolaus Brender (born 1949), German journalist
Nikolaus Ehlen (1886–1965), German pacifist teacher
Nikolaus Federmann (c. 1505 – 1542), German adventurer and conquistador
Nikolaus Frank (born 1964), Swedish industrial designer 
Nikolaus Friedrich von Thouret (1767–1845), German architect
Nikolaus Gerbel (c. 1485 – 1560), German humanist, jurist and doctor of both laws
Nikolaus Geyrhalter (born 1972), Austrian filmmaker
Nikolaus Gjelsvik (1866–1938), Norwegian jurist
Nikolaus Gromann (c. 1500 – 1566), German architect
Nikolaus Katzer (born 1952), German historian
Nikolaus Knoepffler (born 1962), German philosopher
Nikolaus Lenau nom de plume of Nikolaus Franz Niembsch Edler von Strehlenau (1802–1850), Austrian poet
Nikolaus Meyer-Landrut (born 1960), German diplomat
Nikolaus Paryla (born 1939), Austrian actor and stage director
Nikolaus Pevsner (1902–1983), British historian
Nikolaus Senn (1926–2014), Swiss jurist, economist and banker
Nikolaus Stanec (born 1968), Austrian chess master
Nikolaus von Halem (1905–1944), German resistance fighter
Nikolaus von Jeroschin (ca.1290 – 1341), German historian
Nikolaus von Üxküll-Gyllenband (1877–1944), German businessman
Nikolaus Wachsmann (born 1971), German historian
Nikolaus Zmeskall (1759–1833), Hungarian official

Middle name
Andreas Nikolaus Lauda (1949–2019), Austrian Formula One driver known as Niki Lauda
Christian Nikolaus Eberlein (1720–1788), German historical painter
Dietrich Nikolaus Winkel (1777–1826), German inventor 
Franz Nikolaus Finck (1867–1910), German philologist
Franz Nikolaus Novotny (1743–1773), Austrian organist and composer
Friedrich Wilhelm Nikolaus Karl (1831–1888), German Emperor
Georg Nikolaus von Nissen (1761–1826), Danish diplomat and historian
Gustav Nikolaus Tiedemann (1808–1849), German revolutionary
Joseph Nikolaus de Vins (1732–1798), Austrian general
Johann Nikolaus Forkel (1749–1818), German musician, musicologist and music theorist
Johann Nikolaus Götz (1721–1781), German poet
Johann Nikolaus Hanff (1663–1711), German organist and composer
Johann Nikolaus von Hontheim (1701–1790), German historian and theologian
Johann Nikolaus Weislinger (1691 – 29 August 1755), German polemical writer
Johannes Nikolaus Tetens (1736–1807), German-Danish philosopher
Johann Nikolaus Stupanus (1542–1621), Swiss physician
Niels Nikolaus Falck (1784–1850), Danish jurist and historian
Paul Nikolaus Cossmann (1869–1942), German journalist
Simon Nikolaus Euseb von Montjoye-Hirsingen (1693–1775), German Prince-Bishop of Basel
Wilhelm Nikolaus Suksdorf (1850–1932), German botanist

See also

Nickolaus
Nicolaus
Niklaus (name)

Masculine given names